Morkhi is a village located in the Jind district of Haryana state, India. It is located around 165.4 kilometers from Chandigarh.

Villages in Jind district